Mujhay Jeenay Do is  a 2017 Pakistani television series that aired on Urdu 1. Written by Shahid Nizami, the series has an ensemble cast including Hania Amir, Gohar Rasheed, Mehreen Raheel, Nadia Jamil, Salman Shahid and Iffat Rahim.

The show revolves around the social and economic issues, highlighting deeply rooted problems in Pakistan particularly Child marriages.

Plot
Saira, an 8-year-old, lives with her father, Khuda Baksh, elder brother Murad, his wife Khairi and their children in a backward village in Pakistan. Bushra, Saira's elder sister, married to Naseeb, is pregnant with her first child. Yasmin is the village health worker. Yasmin's son Shahab is Saira's best friend. Naseeb is devastated after Bushra dies during childbirth. Saira looks after Naseeb's newborn son. Khuda Baksh and Murad suggest to Naseeb that he should get married to Saira since the newborn baby is attached to her. Naseeb is shocked and rejects the idea. Saira is distressed upon learning that she will be married off to Naseeb. Saira and Naseeb get married. Naseeb doesn't like Saira spending time with Shahab.

Shahab moves to the city with his father Iftikhar, where he is shocked to learn that his father has a second wife Saeeda and a daughter. Shahina takes charge of Naseeb's household chores and lovingly looks after Tipu and Saira. She also teaches Saira how to do household chores. Naseeb is pleased with it and offers to help her financially. Afterwards, Shahab informs Yasmin about his father's second marriage. Although Yasmin is shocked, she tells Shahab that he should learn to live with his father's second family and work hard to make his future better. Naseeb is happy to have Shahina around and begins to fall in love with her. When Tipu falls ill, Yasmin advises Naseeb to take Tipu to a city hospital. However, he gets wrongly informed that Tipu has died. Naseeb blames little Saira for it and tries to strangle her in front of the hospital staff. Later, Naseeb gets arrested for getting married to a minor girl.

Yasmin tries to make Naseeb understand that Saira, a little girl, can't be expected to care for Tipu. Afterwards, Naseeb tells Yasmin that he wants to marry Shahina as he wants someone who can look after his house, and Saira is too young to do it. Yasmin advises him to divorce Saira first. Naseeb knows that Murad will not spare him if he divorces Saira. Further, Yasmin tells Saira that she should continue her studies and that if Naseeb divorces her, so be it.

Shahina gets married to Naseeb. Shahina changes after marriage and makes Saira slog while she sits and enjoys life. Shahina is jealous and insecure of Saira as she knows she is the second wife and mistreats her. Further, Saira is now grown up. Her childhood friend Shahab comes to meet her and asks her whether Naseeb treats her well.

Naseeb threatens to beat Saira up if she doesn't help Shahina. Shahina continues her ill-treatment of Saira when Naseeb is away at work. Shahab tells his friend Dawood that he will stay in the village after completing his studies and help the villagers. Afterwards, Khuda Baksh apologises to Saira for putting her through a lot of suffering. Khuda Baksh then advises Naseeb to buy some property in Saira's name to secure her future. Further, Saira secretly meets Shahab.

Shahina gets upset when she learns that Naseeb has purchased a property for Saira. Shahina insists that Naseeb should give her the house now that he has brought a piece of land for Saira. Naseeb tells her that the home and hotel belong to his son and assures her that he will also make arrangements for her, but Shahina is not satisfied.

Shahina's fears come true when Naseeb spends a night with Saira. Shahina is heartbroken as she feels that Naseeb will leave her. Naseeb takes Saira to Lahore, where she secretly meets Shahab in a restaurant. She tells him that they should not meet again since she is already married. She asks Shahab to have lunch with her and Naseeb; however, Saira falls ill and gets admitted to a hospital. There the doctor tells Naseeb that Saira has suffered a miscarriage. Later, Iftikhar and Shahab assure Naseeb that they will look after Saira and go home to arrange for the money.

Naseeb gets suspicious when he spots Shahab in Saira's hospital room. On Iftikhar's insistence, Naseeb agrees to stay at his place in the city with Saira for a few days. Naseeb finds out about Shahab and Saira's relationship.

Naseeb asks Saira whether she will ever leave him. He tells her that he will kill her if she ever leaves him. Afterwards, Shahina helps Saira to run away. With the help of his friend Dawood, Shahab and Saira escape from the village. Shahab takes Saira to his home in Lahore. Iftikhar orders Shahab to return Saira to her village. Still, when the village head calls him, Iftikhar tells him that he doesn't know where Saira is.

Further, Saira sends 'khula' papers to Naseeb. Afterwards, with the village head's permission, Murad and Naseeb capture Shahab and Saira. Shahab gets beaten up, and Saira is locked up in a room. Naseeb asks Saira why she ran away. Saira tells him that he never asked her what she wanted, even when she was eight years old and growing up. She accuses him of being selfish and tells him she is ready to die. Sitara and Shahina make Naseeb realise his mistake. Later, Naseeb tells her that he will do everything to save Saira and Shahab.

Cast
Hania Amir as Saira: Naseeb's first wife and Shahab's love interest
Raeed Muhammad Alam as Shahab (Shaboo): Saira's love interest
Gohar Rasheed as Naseeb: Saira and Shahina's husband
Nadia Jamil as Yasemine: Shahab's mother
Mehreen Raheel as Shahina: Naseeb's second wife
Sarmad Khoosat as Mehmood Alam: Shahina's ex-husband
Iffat Omer as Shahab's step mother
Salman Shahid as Khuda Baksh: Saira's father (dead)
Omair Rana
Ali Tahir
Sabeena Syed
Kashaf Ahmed
Khalid Butt as village's molvi sahab
Usama Khan
Minsah Ahmed
Samama Arham
Meqaan Raza
Rashid Mehmood
Umar Khan
Iqra Inayat
Hamza Ishtiaq

Production 
The serial was directed and produced by Angeline Malik of Kitni Girhain Baaki Hain fame under her banner Angeline Films, in collaboration with Johns Hopkins University Center for Communication Programs.

Nadia Jamil has made her acting comeback after survival from Cancer and her last appearance in Behadd (2013) while Mehreen Raheel made a comeback to television after her last appearance in 2015 series Tum Mere Kya Ho.

References

External links
 Official website

2017 Pakistani television series debuts
Pakistani drama television series
Urdu-language television shows
Child marriage in Pakistan